Roman van Uden (born 29 October 1988) is a New Zealand professional cyclist.

Major results
Source:

2009
 1st Stage 4 Tour of the Gila
2010
 5th Time trial, National Road Championships
2011
 1st  Points classification Tour of Utah
 9th Road race, National Road Championships
2013
 1st  Overall Sharjah International Cycling Tour
1st Stage 1
 5th Overall New Zealand Cycle Classic
 7th Overall Tour of Al Zubarah
1st Stage 3
 9th Road race, National Road Championships
2014
 5th Overall Sharjah International Cycling Tour
 7th Overall Tour of Al Zubarah
1st Prologue
2015
 9th The REV Classic

References

External links

1988 births
Living people
New Zealand male cyclists
21st-century New Zealand people